The Baishui River is a short tributary of the Yangtze River in Yunnan Province, China. The river has its source on the eastern flanks of Jade Dragon Snow Mountain in Lijiang prefecture-level city.  The river flows towards the east for approximately  before joining the Yangtze.

See also
Three Parallel Rivers of Yunnan Protected Areas
List of rivers in China

Rivers of Yunnan
Tributaries of the Yangtze River
Geography of Lijiang